The Chicago Park District is one of the oldest and the largest park districts in the United States. As of 2016, there are over 600 parks included in the Chicago Park District as well as 27 beaches, 10 boat docking harbors, two botanic conservatories, a zoo, and 11 museums. The Chicago Park District also has more than over 230 field houses, 78 public pools, and dozens of sports and recreational facilities, with year-round programming. The district is an independent taxing authority as defined by Illinois State Statute and is considered a separate (or "sister") agency of the City of Chicago. The district's headquarters are located in the Time-Life Building in the Streeterville neighborhood.

Jurisdiction

A number of these are tourist destinations, most notably Lincoln Park, Chicago's largest park which has over 20 million visitors each year, second only to Central Park in New York City. With 10 lakefront harbors located within a number of parks along the lakefront, the Chicago Park District is also the nation's largest municipal harbor system.

A number of Chicago Park District parks are located in the vicinity of or even adjacent to a number of Chicago Public Schools. This design was done in order to make it easier for public school students and faculty to incorporate school assignments or physical activities into the learning experience. Additionally, a number of Chicago Public Library locations are sited within Chicago Park District facilities.

The Chicago Park District is governed by a board of seven (7) non-salaried Commissioners who are appointed by the Mayor of the City of Chicago with the approval of the Chicago City Council.

Notable parks
 Burnham Park - ; runs along the Lakefront for much of the South Side connecting Jackson Park with Grant Park
 Calumet Park  - ; shares a border with the State of Indiana, and is also located on the lake. 
 Columbus Park - ; on the far west side of Chicago, considered one of the 150 Great Places in Illinois
 Douglass (Anna and Frederick) Park -  and named after Frederick Douglass and his wife Anna Murray Douglass, it is Southwest of downtown.
 Garfield Park - ; this west side park contains a grand conservatory and lagoon
 Grant Park - ; located near The Loop; Home to Buckingham Fountain, this downtown park is also a favorite site of major festivals including the Taste of Chicago, Chicago Blues Festival, Chicago Jazz Festival, Lollapolooza and others.
 Humboldt Park -  on the west side, was once a cultural center of Chicago's Puerto Rican Community and the site of a famous rally by pianist and statesman Ignace Paderewski that led to Poland regaining its independence after the First World War.
 Jackson Park - ; located on the south side of the city on Lake Michigan, this park is famous for its role in the 1893 World's Columbian Exposition.
 Lincoln Park - ; Chicago's largest city park. Located north of The Loop, this is one of the more distinctive parks in terms of geography, because while it is centrally located in the Lincoln Park community area it spans many different neighborhoods throughout the north side as it is nestled between Lake Shore Drive and Lake Michigan.
 Marquette Park - ; the largest park in southwest Chicago, it has a golf course and many other attractions
 Millennium Park - ; Chicago's newest marquee park, opened in 2004, just north of the Art Institute of Chicago in Grant Park.
 Washington Park - ; located on the south side, it was the proposed location for the 2016 Summer Olympics Stadium.

History
In the 1860s, Chicago already had about 40 small parks, but no central plan, and it fell far short when compared to other major cities in the country. Lincoln Park was Chicago's first large park, created in 1860. Dr. John H. Rauch MD, who was a member of the Chicago Board of Health and later a president of the Illinois State Board of Health, played a key role in establishing Lincoln Park by persuading city officials to close several festering cemeteries filled with shallow graves of victims of infectious epidemics. Rauch next formulated a central plan for parks across the entire city, noting that they were "the lungs of the city", and pointing out that Chicago's parks were inferior to those in New York's Central Park, Baltimore's Druid Hill Park, and Philadelphia's Fairmount Park. His influence was key in setting up Chicago's modern park system.

The current Chicago Park District was created in 1934 by the Illinois Legislature under the Park Consolidation Act (70 ILCS 1505 et seq). By provisions of that act, the Chicago Park District consolidated and superseded the then-existing 22 separate park districts in Chicago, the largest three of which were the Lincoln Park, West Park, and South Park Districts, all of which had been established in 1869.  In the late 1960s,  the district lent its support for a Special Olympics for developmental challenged children.  The Park District co-sponsored the first Special Olympics at Soldier Field in 1968.

In the past several years, the Park District has initiated a program of renovating and beautifying existing parks and playgrounds, as well as initiating the building of a number of new parks, including Ping Tom Memorial Park, Ellis Park, DuSable Park Maggie Daley Park and others. The Chicago Park District has also expanded programming in neighborhood parks throughout the city, and created a lakefront concert venue on Northerly Island on the site of the former Meigs Field airport.  In 2014, the district won the National Gold Medal Award for Excellence in Parks and Recreation.

Museums in the Park
Park District land hosts 11 museums in locations around the city. They are: 
Adler Planetarium
Art Institute of Chicago
Chicago History Museum
DuSable Museum of African American History
The Field Museum
John G. Shedd Aquarium
National Museum of Mexican Art
National Museum of Puerto Rican Arts and Culture
Museum of Science and Industry
Museum of Contemporary Art
Peggy Notebaert Nature Museum

In addition, the district's parks host the free admission Lincoln Park zoological park, the Garfield Park Conservatory, and the Lincoln Park Conservatory.

Government
The Chicago Park District's seven Commissioners govern the district. Under the Chicago Park District code, the Commissioners have a fiduciary duty to act, vote on all matters, and govern the Park District in the best interest of the Park District. The Commissioners appoint the General Superintendent & Chief Executive Officer. On May 11, 2022, Rosa Escareño was appointed to the position.

Lifeguard Service
The Chicago Lifeguard Service, or the Chicago Park District Beaches and Pools Unit, employs over 1000 as aquatics staff during the summer and 300 year round to protect the lives of patrons. Lifeguards are stationed at 23 beaches on Lake Michigan plus one inland beach, as well as, 26 indoor and 51 outdoor pools at city parks and 15 pools in public schools. The Service is the largest municipal lifeguard force in the world and is regularly observed by representatives from Japan, Australia, Ireland, Germany, California, Florida and other locales. The Service also covers more waterfront than any other individual lifeguard force in the world; Chicago beaches cover over 26 miles of the lakefront.

Image gallery

See also
 Friends of the Parks
 Parkways Foundation

References

External links
 Chicago Park District
  

•
Government of Chicago
Park districts in Illinois
1934 establishments in Illinois